David Evan Jones (born 1946) is an American pianist and composer of chamber music, opera, and computer music.

Jones was a student of composer Roger Reynolds and Pauline Oliveros at University of California, San Diego, before studying at IRCAM in Paris. Later he joined the faculty at Dartmouth College, New Hampshire, in the 1980s before becoming professor of music at University of California at Santa Cruz.

Works
His notable compositions include Scritto, which features digitally manipulated vowel sounds. He has also written one chamber opera, Bardos, which premiered in Seoul, South Korea in 2004. His work was also selected to be part of 60x60.

Discography
 Fast & Odd: Neo-Balkan Jazz and Concert Music Centaur CRC2655

References 

1946 births
Living people
American male composers
20th-century American composers
University of California, Santa Cruz faculty
20th-century American pianists
American male pianists
21st-century American pianists
20th-century American male musicians
21st-century American male musicians